Lasianthera is a genus of flowering plants belonging to the family Stemonuraceae.

Its native range is Nigeria to Western Central Tropical Africa.

Species:
 Lasianthera africana P.Beauv.

References

Stemonuraceae
Asterid genera